Matt Laug (born March 17, 1968) is an American drummer who has played with many bands/artists such as Alanis Morissette, Alice Cooper, Slash's Snakepit and Vasco Rossi.

Matt moved to Los Angeles after graduating from South Florence High School in 1986 and after attending college in LA, Matt became a sought after studio drummer. Along with a long list of many other rock artists, Matt played drums on Alanis Morissette's June 1995 album, Jagged Little Pill, which sold over 16 million copies and was the number one album on the US Billboard 200 for the decade 1990–1999.

He also played drums as a part of Steve Plunkett's reformed Autograph line-up from 2002 to 2005.

In 2005, Matt Laug joined Mike Campbell of Tom Petty and the Heartbreakers in his side band known as The Dirty Knobs, and the band since has played occasional shows for the next 15 years in between Heartbreakers shows in Los Angeles. After the death of Tom Petty in 2017 effectively ending the Heartbreakers and following Campbell's world tour with Fleetwood Mac, the band released its debut album Wreckless Abandon on March 20.

References

Living people
Slash's Snakepit members
Musicians from Los Angeles
Place of birth missing (living people)
American rock drummers
1968 births